Seed of Chucky is a 2004 black comedy slasher film, the fifth installment of the Child's Play series, and sequel to 1998's Bride of Chucky as well as the first film to be distributed by another company since the original Child's Play. The film was written and directed by Don Mancini, who created the series and has written all of the films (except the 2019 remake), and stars Jennifer Tilly, Redman, Hannah Spearritt, John Waters, Billy Boyd and Brad Dourif.  With this entry, Mancini made his directorial debut. The film is set six years after Bride of Chucky and follows a young doll named Glen, the son of Chucky and Tiffany, resurrecting his parents, causing chaos.

The film, shot in Romania, continues the series' evolution from the pure horror genre of the first three films to a hybrid horror-comedy. It was the last Child's Play film from the original continuity to be released in theaters, with all future installments to be released direct-to-video until the 2019 reboot. The film was followed by another sequel, Curse of Chucky, released on home video and Netflix in 2013.

Seed of Chucky grossed over $24 million against a $12 million budget. Like its predecessor, the film received mixed reviews from critics.

Plot 
Six years after the previous film, Glen, the benevolent living-doll son of Chucky and Tiffany, has a nightmare in which he murders a little girl's parents. In reality, he is living as a dummy for "Psychs", an abusive ventriloquist in England. Glen sees a preview of Jennifer Tilly's new horror film Chucky Goes Psycho on television, which features Chucky and Tiffany dolls rebuilt from their original remains; Glen realizes that he is their son.

Desperate to know his parents, Glen escapes Psychs and tracks the Chucky and Tiffany dolls to a prop room in Hollywood. Glen uses the Heart of Damballa, a voodoo amulet, to bring them back to life. Chucky faints upon learning he has a son, but Tiffany is overjoyed. When a special effects technician starts taking Tiffany apart, she and Chucky decapitate him with a wire. Jennifer finds the beheaded body and calls the police. Chucky, Tiffany, and Glen sneak a ride to her home in her limousine.

Having witnessed his parents murder the technician, Glen asks them why they kill, as he feels violence is bad. Chucky and Tiffany are taken aback by the question and don't know how to answer, until Chucky replies that it helps them to relax. On the other hand, Tiffany, feeling parental responsibility, agrees with Glen and forces Chucky to agree to stop killing for the sake of their son; Chucky falsely promises to do so. Jennifer tries to get a role as the Virgin Mary in Redman's directorial debut. After he tells her she is not right for the part, Jennifer invites him to her home, intending to seduce him for the role, much to the chagrin of her agent Joan.

Chucky and Tiffany make plans to transfer their souls into Redman and Jennifer. Tiffany knocks them out and uses a turkey baster to inseminate Jennifer with Chucky's semen, intending to use her baby as a host for Glen's soul. Chucky takes Glen on a car ride  during which they drive Britney Spears' car off the road  to photographer Pete Peters' darkroom. Peters had taken pictures of Tilly kissing Redman and of Chucky masturbating. Glen tries to warn Peters that Chucky is about to attack, but Peters bumps into a shelf and causes a jar of sulphuric acid to fall into his head, accidentally killing him. Chucky is overjoyed, believing Glen did this on purpose, and takes a picture to celebrate, much to the dismay of both Glen and Tiffany.

Jennifer awakens the following morning, realizes that she is pregnant, and claims Redman is responsible. Redman denies this and reveals that he previously had a vasectomy, leaving Jennifer confused. He also tells Jennifer that, in light of her pregnancy, she is fired from his film. Tiffany eviscerates Redman in anger, which Glen witnesses. The next day, Jennifer wakes up to find herself with a full pregnant belly, a consequence of the voodoo magic. Chucky captures Jennifer and her chauffeur Stan to take Redman's place. Jennifer's assistant Joan tries to help her, but she is killed by Glen's murderous twin sister, Glenda, whose soul shares Glen's body and has taken over. Tiffany smacks Glenda to bring back Glen, who is horrified at what has happened.

Jennifer gives birth to twins, a boy and a girl, and Tiffany realizes that both Glen and Glenda can inhabit the two children. Chucky, amidst Jennifer screaming for help along with the crying babies and Tiffany screaming at him to initiate the ritual before the police arrive, has a sensory overload and stops chanting the spell. He has an epiphany: Chucky has finally accepted his circumstances as a living doll and no longer wishes to become human. Disgusted, Tiffany rejects Chucky and decides to take Glen with her. Enraged, Chucky throws a knife at Jennifer to stop Tiffany from leaving him, but Stan jumps in the way to save her. The police arrive, forcing the dolls to flee.

Jennifer is rushed to the hospital. Tiffany drugs Jennifer and begins to possess her, but Chucky breaks in and kills Tiffany with an axe. Devastated, Glen snaps and attacks Chucky, striking him with the axe. Chucky assumes it's Glenda again, but Glen reveals it is actually him, finally able to kill in revenge for his mother's death. Glen shouts at his father, asking if he is finally proud of him, as he dismembers Chucky, who praises Glen for his actions, before being decapitated. Realizing what he has done, Glen suffers an emotional breakdown as Jennifer comforts him.

Five years later, at a birthday party for Jennifer's children, a nanny quits her job because Jennifer's daughter Glenda scares her. Jennifer beats her to death with the Tiffany doll body, revealing that Tiffany was successful in transferring her soul into Jennifer's body. Meanwhile, Glen opens a birthday present to see Chucky's severed arm, which springs up to grab him.

Cast

Production
Production on a new film called Son of Chucky began on October 18, 1998, two days after the successful release of Bride of Chucky, whose director Ronny Yu was unable to return due to scheduling conflicts. Don Mancini, who is gay and was interested in exploring LGBT-related themes in the next film, decided to write a screenplay inspired by the 1953 cult classic Glen or Glenda in which Chucky's son is an innocent person suffering from gender dysphoria. He also decided to continue the shift in the series towards comedy after noting that horror villains such as Michael Myers, Jason Voorhees, and Freddy Krueger became less scary as they became more familiar with audiences.

Universal Pictures, which produced the previous three films and had expected a more conventional slasher film with the son being a murderous villain, rejected the script with the note "This is too gay." Production ultimately resumed when the project was approved by Focus Features after the successful release of Cabin Fever in 2003, and was ultimately released through Rogue Pictures. Mancini claimed in a podcast that prior to casting Redman, he had offered to cast Quentin Tarantino as himself but he declined.

Seed of Chucky was filmed almost entirely in Romania at Castel Studios in order to save costs. Mancini tried to replicate the look of older horror films by shooting the film mostly on sound stages and was additionally influenced by the filmmaking styles of Brian De Palma and Dario Argento. All of the animatronic and makeup effects were the handiwork of Effects Designer Tony Gardner, who also appears in the film as himself in a cameo, and his company Alterian, Inc.

Release and reception

Box office
Seed of Chucky opened at #4 with $8,774,520 on November 11–14, 2004. When the film closed on December 23, 2004, the domestic gross was $17,083,732 and $24,829,644 worldwide.

In Australia, Seed of Chucky opened at #8 with $260,958 for the week of February 6–8, 2005 behind Million Dollar Baby (#2) and Sky Captain and the World of Tomorrow (#6). In Australia, Seed of Chucky was distributed by United International Pictures.

In France, Seed of Chucky opened at #11 with $694,948 for the week of March 2–8, 2005. It opened behind Le Couperet (#2) and the remake of Assault of Precinct 13 (#4). In France, Seed of Chucky was distributed by SND Distribution.

In the United Kingdom, Seed of Chucky opened at #10 with $202,022 for the week of May 13–15, 2005. It opened behind Monster-in-Law (#2), The Jacket (#8), and A Good Woman (#9). In the United Kingdom, Seed of Chucky was distributed by Momentum Pictures.

Critical reception

On Rotten Tomatoes, the film holds a 34% approval rating based on 77 reviews, with a weighted average of 4.50/10. The critical consensus reads: "Give Seed of Chucky credit for embracing the increasing absurdity of the franchise — even if the end results really aren't all that funny or entertaining." On Metacritic, it has an average score of 46/100, indicating "mixed to average reviews". Audiences polled by CinemaScore gave the film an average grade of "C+" on an A+ to F scale.

Roger Ebert gave the film two stars out of four stating, "Seed of Chucky is actually two movies, one wretched, the other funny."

Awards

Sequels
The film was followed by Curse of Chucky in 2013, Cult of Chucky in 2017, and the TV series Chucky in 2021.

References

External links

 
 
 
 

2004 films
2004 horror films
2000s pregnancy films
Films shot in Bucharest
Films shot in Romania
Films set in 2004
Films set in 2009
Relativity Media films
Films set in California
Films set in Los Angeles
Metafictional works
2000s parody films
Parodies of horror
American pregnancy films
Slasher comedy films
American sequel films
American slasher films
2000s comedy horror films
Child's Play (franchise) films
American splatter films
British splatter films
Films scored by Pino Donaggio
American LGBT-related films
Films directed by Don Mancini
LGBT-related horror films
Rogue (company) films
2000s slasher films
Cultural depictions of Britney Spears
Films set in Somerset
2004 directorial debut films
2004 comedy films
Films about assassinations
2000s English-language films
2000s American films
2004 LGBT-related films
Films about Voodoo